Sven Šoštarič Karič (born 7 March 1998) is a Slovenian footballer who plays for Maribor as a defender.

Club career
In early 2017, Karič signed for Derby County of the Championship after trialing with Croatian team Dinamo Zagreb and refusing a professional contract from Slovenian side Maribor.

In March 2019, he was sent on loan to Braintree Town in the English fifth division.

International career
Karič debuted with the senior Slovenia national team in a friendly 6–0 win over Gibraltar on 4 June 2021.

Personal life
He is the son of the former Slovenian international Amir Karić. His sister Tija is also a footballer.

Notes

References

External links
Sven Karič at Soccerway
Sven Karič at NZS 

1998 births
Living people
Slovenian footballers
Slovenian expatriate footballers
Association football defenders
Derby County F.C. players
Braintree Town F.C. players
NK Domžale players
NK Maribor players
National League (English football) players
Slovenian PrvaLiga players
Slovenian expatriate sportspeople in England
Expatriate footballers in England
Slovenia youth international footballers
Slovenia under-21 international footballers
Slovenia international footballers
Slovenian people of Bosnia and Herzegovina descent